The 2010–11 Israeli Basketball State Cup was the 51st edition of the Israeli Basketball State Cup, organized by the Israel Basketball Association. 26 teams took part in the competition. The semifinals and finals was played at the Yad Eliyahu Arena in Tel Aviv.

Main draw
Following IBA's rules, the current champions, Hapoel Gilboa Galil, and the cup holders, Maccabi Tel Aviv, have been drawn straight into the quarterfinals, into different halves of the draw. Two other random teams, Bnei HaSharon and Barak Netanya, have been drawn straight into the second round.

See also
2010–11 Israeli Basketball Super League
Israeli Basketball State Cup

2010-11
State Cup